This is a list of events that occurred in the year 1638 in art.

Events
Anthony van Dyck is granted denizenship by Charles I of England and marries Mary, daughter of Lord Ruthven; his assistant Adriaen Hanneman returns to his native Hague to become the leading portraitist there.
Francisco Zurbarán begins work on the series of paintings in the Santa María de Guadalupe

Works
Gian Lorenzo Bernini – Bust of Thomas Baker
Frans Hals – Claes Duyst van Voorhout
Hubert Le Sueur – Equestrian statue of Charles I, Charing Cross (London)
Nicolas Poussin – Et in Arcadia ego (Les bergers d'Arcadie, Louvre)
Rembrandt 
Landscape with the Good Samaritan
Stormy Landscape
Peter Paul Rubens
The Massacre of the Innocents (second version – approximate date)
The Judgement of Paris (second version – approximate date)
Justus Sustermans – Portrait of Galileo Galilei
Anthony van Dyck – some dates approximate
Equestrian Portrait of Charles I
George Digby
Thomas Killigrew
Thomas Killigrew and Lord Crofts
Lord John Stuart and his brother Lord Bernard Stuart
Triple Portrait of Henrietta Maria

Births
January 8 - Elisabetta Sirani, Italian painter (died 1665)
May 12 - Pedro Atanasio Bocanegra, Spanish painter (died 1688)
June 6 (bapt.) - Gerrit Adriaenszoon Berckheyde, Dutch artist (died 1698)
July 10 – David Teniers III, Flemish painter (died 1685)
August 22 - Georg Christoph Eimmart, German draughtsman and engraver (died 1705)
September 20 - Antonio Gherardi, painter, sculptor and architect (died 1702)
October 31 (bapt.) – Meindert Hobbema, Dutch landscape painter (died 1709)
date unknown
Antonio Franchi, Italian painter active mainly in Florence and Lucca (died 1709)
Luigi Garzi, Italian painter of the Baroque period (died 1721)
Crisóstomo Martinez, Valencian painter and engraver known for his anatomical atlas (died 1694)
Mo'en Mosavver, Persian miniaturist during the Safavid period (died 1697)
Jan Karel Donatus van Beecq, Dutch painter (died 1722)

Deaths
January - Adriaen Brouwer, Flemish genre painter (born 1605)
March 6 - Paulus Moreelse, Dutch painter, mainly of portraits (born 1571)
March 10 - Cornelis van der Geest, Flemish merchant and art collector (born 1577)
April 14 - Willem Jacobsz Delff, Dutch painter (born 1580)
August 1 - Joachim Wtewael, Dutch painter and engraver (born 1566)
August 18 - Giovanni Andrea Ansaldo, Italian painter active mainly in Genoa (born 1584)
October - Gillis d'Hondecoeter, Dutch painter in a Flemish style (born 1575/1580)
November 11 - Cornelis van Haarlem, Dutch painter and draughtsman, leading Mannerist artist (born 1562)
December 23 - Barbara Longhi, Italian painter (born 1552)
date unknown
Pietro Francesco Alberti, Italian painter and engraver (born 1584)
Baldassare Aloisi, Italian portrait painter and engraver (born 1578)
Vincenzo Carducci, Italian painter (born 1568)
Santo Peranda, historical painter of Venice (born 1566)
Giovanni Giacomo Semenza, Italian painter (born 1580)
Magdalena van de Passe, engraver and important member of the Van de Passe family of artists (born 1600)
Jacob van Swanenburgh, Dutch history painter and teacher (born 1571)
probable 
Odoardo Fialetti, Italian painter and printmaker (born 1573)
Hercules Seghers, Dutch painter and printmaker of the Dutch Golden Age (born 1589)

 
Years of the 17th century in art
1630s in art